The 2014–15 Lafayette Leopards women's basketball team represented Bucknell University during the 2014–15 NCAA Division I women's basketball season. The Bison, led by fourth year head coach Aaron Roussell, played their home games at Sojka Pavilion and were members of the Patriot League. They finished the season 18–12, 10–8 in Patriot League play for a tie to finish in fourth place. They lost in the quarterfinals of the Patriot League women's tournament to Navy. Despite having 18 wins, they were not invited to a postseason tournament.

Roster

 3 	Tyler Craig 	G 	5-8 	Jr. 	Columbus, Ohio (St. Francis DeSales)
 4 	Claire Maree O'Bryan 	G 	5-10 	Jr. 	Darwin, Australia (The Hill School (Pa.))
 10 	Julia Gnieser 	G 	5-6 	Fr. 	Dix Hills, N.Y. (Half Hollow Hills East)
 11 	Megan McGurk 	G 	5-7 	So. 	West Chester, Pa. (Academy of Notre Dame)
 12 	Claire DeBoer 	F 	6-1 	So. 	Grosse Pointe, Mich. (Grosse Pointe South)
 13 	Jorden Sneed 	G 	5-6 	So. 	Chatsworth, Calif. (Sierra Canyon)
 21 	Jacquie Klotz 	G 	6-0 	Fr. 	West Windsor, N.J. (The Lawrenceville School)
 23 	Tara Wilk 	G 	5-5 	Sr. 	Washington, N.J. (Immaculate Heart Academy)
 31 	Katherine Harris 	G 	5-6 	Sr. 	Derry, N.H. (Pinkerton Academy)
 32 	Catherine Romaine 	F 	6-2 	Fr. 	Chapel Hill, N.C. (Chapel Hill)
 33 	Carly Richardson 	G 	5-11 	Fr. 	Palmyra, Pa. (Palmyra)
 34 	Sheaira Jones 	G 	5-9 	Jr. 	Cincinnati, Ohio (Colerain)
 35 	Micki Impellizeri 	F 	6-3 	Sr. 	Seaford, N.Y. (St. Anthony's)
 41 	Sune Swart 	F 	6-3 	So. 	Franklin, Pa. (Cranberry)
 44 	Audrey Dotson 	F 	6-1 	Sr. 	Vienna, Va. (Flint Hill School)

Schedule

|-
!colspan=9 style="background:#FF5E17; color:#0041C4;"| Non-conference regular season

|-
!colspan=9 style="background:#FF5E17; color:#0041C4;"| Patriot regular season

|-
!colspan=9 style="background:#FF5E17; color:#0041C4;"| Patriot League Women's Tournament

See also
2014–15 Bucknell Bison men's basketball team

References

Bucknell
Bucknell Bison women's basketball seasons
2014 in sports in Pennsylvania
2015 in sports in Pennsylvania